Polygyrinidae is an extinct family of fossil sea snails, marine gastropod mollusks in the clade Caenogastropoda.

References
Notes

Bibliography
 The Taxonomicon

Prehistoric gastropods